Ōrākei railway station in the Auckland suburb of Remuera is located on the North Island Main Trunk line in New Zealand. Eastern Line services of the Auckland railway network are the only services that regularly stop at the station. It has an island platform layout and can be reached by an overbridge from Ōrākei Road. It is backed by a car-park and a shopping complex.

History
The station was originally constructed, along with five others, in 1929 on the route of the Westfield Deviation, which was being built to divert the Auckland–Westfield section of the North Island Main Trunk line (NIMT) via a flatter, faster eastern route to link up with the original NIMT tracks at Westfield Junction.

Ōrākei  Bay Village 
From 2016 warehouses beside the station were converted for use as shops and a cinema, after a 2008 plan by the Redwood development group, for several skyscraper apartment buildings, green space and waterfront access, had been defeated.  A plan limited to six stories was then discussed. It would have retained public access and amenities, and provided a covered train station.

Services 
Auckland One Rail, on behalf of Auckland Transport, operates suburban services between Britomart Transport Centre and Manukau station via this station. The basic weekday off-peak timetable is:
3 tph to Britomart
3 tph to Manukau

Bus route 781 serves Ōrākei station.

See also 
 List of Auckland railway stations

References 

Rail transport in Auckland
Railway stations in New Zealand
Railway stations opened in 1930